The Great American Brass Band Festival is a music festival held each June in Danville, Kentucky since 1990. The open-air festival features a wide variety of brass bands, a hot air balloon race, a picnic, and other activities. Each year up to 40,000 people travel to the small town (population 15,000) for the event.

Bands that have performed at the Festival 

Bands that have performed at the event since 1990 include:

 202nd Army Band (Kentucky Army National Guard), Frankfort, Kentucky (2002-2003, 2005-2006)
 257th Army Band, Washington, DC (2003-2004)
 8th Regiment Band, Rome, Georgia (2002-2003, 2006)
 Advocate Brass Band, Danville, Kentucky (1991-2012)
 Athena Brass Band Montgomery Village, Maryland (2005)
 Band of the Air Force Reserve, Robins AFB, Georgia (2002)
 Brass Band of Columbus, Columbus, Ohio (2007)
 BrassRoots, Mount Brydges, Ontario (2005)
 Boston Brass, (2006)
 Centre Trumpets, Danville, Kentucky (2005)
 Chicago Brass Band, Chicago, Illinois (2005, 2009)
 Cincinnati Brass Band, Cincinnati, Ohio (2002)
 Circle City Sidewalk Stompers (clown band), Indianapolis, Indiana (2002-2012)
 Danville Pipe Band, Danville, Kentucky (2003-2006)
 Dick Domek and the Walnut Street Ragtime Ramblers, Kentucky (2006)
 DiMartino/Osland Jazz Orchestra, Lexington, Kentucky (2005)
 Dixie Express (2002)
 Dixie Power Trio, Fredericksburg, Virginia (2002-2004)
 Dodworth Saxhorn Band, Ann Arbor, Michigan (2005)
 Euphouria (tuba/euphonium quartet), Cookeville, Tennessee (2002-2006)
 Federal City Brass Band, Baltimore, Maryland (2004)
 Fountain City Brass Band, Kansas City, Missouri (2008, 2010)
 Franconian Harmonics, Estenfeld, Germany (2004)
 Great Olympian Trad. Jazz Band, New Orleans, Louisiana (2005-2006)
 Indiana Wind Symphony, Indianapolis, Indiana (2006, 2011)
 Intrada Brass Band, Oakville, Ontario (2004)
 James Madison University Brass Band, Harrisonburg, Virginia (2006)
 Kentuckiana Brass and Percussion Ensemble, Kentucky/Indiana (1990)
 Lexington Brass Band, Lexington, Kentucky (2003, 2006)
 London Citadel Brass Band, London, Ontario (2006)
 Madison Community Band, Richmond, Kentucky (2012, 2016)
 Main Street Brass, Cynthiana, Kentucky (2002-2003)
 Millennium Brass Quintet (2002, 2004, 2006)
 Mississauga Temple Band, Mississauga, Ontario (2003)
 Mr. Jack Daniel's Silver Cornet Band, Murfreesboro, Tennessee (2004)
 Munich Trumpet Ensemble, Munich, Germany (2002)
 Musikverein Herforst 1933 e.V., Herforst, Germany (2000,2002)
 National Capital Band of the S.A., Washington, DC (2005)
 New Columbian Wind Band (2002)
 Ohio Wheelmen, Findley, Ohio (2005-2006)
 Olde Towne Brass, Huntsville, Alabama (2002-2003)
 Olympia Brass Band, New Orleans, Louisiana (2002-2004)
 Piedmont Trombone Society, Atlanta, Georgia (2006)
 Rhythm & Brass, Waco, Texas (2005-2006)
 Saxton's Cornet Band, Kentucky (2004-2006)
 Sierra del Mar Divisional Band, San Diego, California (2004)
 Southern Territorial Band of the Salvation Army, Atlanta, Georgia (2002)
 St. James Tripolians Steel Orchestra, Trinidad (2002)
 The Disneyland Band (2002)
 The Federal City Brass Band, Baltimore, Maryland (2004)
 The Hellcats, West Point, New York (2003)
 The U.S. Air Force Band of Flight, Wright-Patterson AFB, Ohio (2004)
 The U.S. Coast Guard Band, New London, Connecticut (2003)
 U.S. Marine Band Brass Quintet, Washington, DC (2002)
 Triangle Youth Band, Raleigh, North Carolina (2003)
 Village Brass, Columbus, Ohio (2003)

Other musicians and featured appearances 

 Allen Vizzutti, Mercer Island, Washington (2005)
 Steve Sykes, Shepton Mallet, Somerset, UK (2001)
 Daniel Rodriguez, New York, New York (2002)
 Patricia Backhaus, Waukesha, Wisconsin (2005)
 Frederick Fennell, 1914-2004 (2001)
 Jens Lindemann, Los Angeles, California (2006)
 Scott Kirby, Sandpoint, Idaho (2003-2005)
 Steven Mead, Fenny Drayton, Warks, UK (2005)
 The Wheelmen, Ohio (2003-2004)

External links 
Official site.

Tourist attractions in Boyle County, Kentucky
Danville, Kentucky
Music festivals in Kentucky
Performing arts in Kentucky